

Hosts

Additional notes
Ron MacLean was the main sportscaster and host for the Beijing 2008 Summer Olympics until the death of his mother; Scott Russell assumed the post.

By event

Winter Olympics

1992

1998

2002

2006

2014

2018

2022

Summer Olympics

1976

1984

1988

2008

2016

2020

References

CBC Sports
CBC
CBC commentators